Cuthbert Bellott  was an Anglican priest in the late 16th and early 17th centuries.

Bellott was born in Moreton, Cheshire and educated at Jesus College, Cambridge, where he became a Fellow in 1586.
He was appointed  Canon (9th Prebend) of Westminster Abbey   in 1594 and Archdeacon of Chester in 1596. He died in 1620.

References

1620 deaths
Archdeacons of Chester
Westminster Abbey
Alumni of Jesus College, Cambridge
Fellows of Jesus College, Cambridge
People from Cheshire